Elizabeth Lynne (born 22 January 1948) is a British politician, and was a Member of the European Parliament (MEP) for the West Midlands for the Liberal Democrats from the 1999 European election until she retired in 2012. Previously she had been elected as Member of Parliament (MP) for Rochdale at the 1992 general election but was defeated at the 1997 general election.

Biography
Lynne was born in Woking and educated at Dorking County Grammar School. Between 1966 and 1989 she was an actress, appearing in The Mousetrap. She also worked as a speech consultant between 1988 and 1992.  In 1987 general election she contested Harwich where she was defeated. Lynne is the founder and former chair of the Indonesian Co-ordination for the British Section of Amnesty International. Whilst an MP she was the Liberal Democrats' spokesperson on Health and Community Care, and then spokesperson on Social Security and Disability. She is also one the patrons for the domestic violence charity ManKind Initiative.

She was rated as the 35th best out of all 785 MEPs and 9th best of the 78 UK MEPs on promoting transparency and reform according to the Open Europe think tank. She was a founding member—and Vice President—of the European Parliament Intergroup MEPs Against Cancer.

Political career

Lynne has been an MP and an MEP. She sat as an MEP for the West Midlands from 1999 to 2012. On 5 November 2011 she announced that she would be stepping down from the position, and she did so on 3 February 2012. Her seat was filled by Phil Bennion, who was second on the Liberal Democrat party list.

References

External links 
Liz Lynne MEP official site
Elizabeth Lynne profile at the European Parliament
Liz Lynne archived profile at the site of the Liberal Democrats
 

1948 births
Living people
Liberal Democrats (UK) MPs for English constituencies
Liberal Democrats (UK) MEPs
Female members of the Parliament of the United Kingdom for English constituencies
UK MPs 1992–1997
Members of the Parliament of the United Kingdom for Rochdale
MEPs for England 1999–2004
MEPs for England 2004–2009
MEPs for England 2009–2014
20th-century women MEPs for England
21st-century women MEPs for England
People from Woking
British actor-politicians
People educated at Dorking Grammar School
ManKind Initiative people